Nether Staveley is a civil parish in the South Lakeland District of Cumbria, England. It contains eightlisted buildings that are recorded in the National Heritage List for England.  All the listed buildings are designated at Grade II, the lowest of the three grades, which is applied to "buildings of national importance and special interest".  The parish is entirely rural, and the listed buildings consist of a farmhouse with associated farm buildings and other structures, and a coppice barn standing in an isolated site.


Buildings

References

Citations

Sources

Lists of listed buildings in Cumbria